Number One Kodalu (No.1 Kodalu) was an Indian Telugu language family and drama television series aired on Zee Telugu from 9 December 2019 to 9 July 2022. It stars Sudha Chandran, Madhumitha and Jai Dhanush in lead roles. It is also available on digital streaming platform ZEE5.

Plot 
The story revolves between two women, Vagdhevi and Saraswathi. Vagdhevi is a business entrepreneur, who is looking for an educated girl for her son Rahul. Saraswathi is an illiterate woman with a kind and good heart. After a series of consequences, Rahul marries Sarasu. He hides the truth from Vagdhevi and introduces her as maid and named as Vani. Rahul educates her to get a good impression from Vagdhevi. Finally Vagdhevi accepts her as daughter-in-law.

Cast

Main 
 Madhumitha H as Saraswathi aka Sarasu/Brahmini/Vani; Rahul's wife; Vagdhevi and Arun Prasad's daughter-in-law
 Baby Sahrudha as Young Sarasu
 Jai Dhanush as Rahul; Vagdhevi and Arun Prasad's son
 Sudha Chandran as Vagdhevi; Arun Prasad's wife; Rahul, Teja and Navya's mother

Recurring 
 Anshu Reddy as Preethi
 Meghana Khushi as Preethi
 Usha Vaibhavi as Preethi
 Suresh as Arun Babu; Vagdevi's husband
 Kranthi as Teja; Vanaja's husband
 Sireesha as Uma; Sarasu's mother
 Sri Rithika as Vanaja; Teja's wife
 Hrithi as Vanaja
 Jackie as Jagannadham;
 Sakshi Shiva as Jagannadham; Sarasu's father
 Siddu as Chakri
 Vasudha as Manasa
 Naveena as Nagamani
 Anusha Sasurala as Maggie
 Akarsh Byramudi as Arjun
 Bhavana Reddy as Arjun's mother
 Rajitha as Katyayani
 Kondareddy as Katyayani's son
 Neeraja as Shyamala
 Sidhu as Chakri
 Numa Chandar as Navya
 Paddu as Navya
 Abhilasha as Chakri's fake wife
 Manjula Paritala as Lawyer
 Madhu Reddy as Judge
 Bobby as Varun
 Vijaya as Savitri: Brahmini's mother
 Balaji as Narayana; Brahmini's father
 Chalapathi Chowdary as Eeshwar Prasad
 Chalapathi Rao as Ekambharam; Vaghevi's personal assistant
 Pravallika as Priya
 Durga Prasad as Abhi
 Rithika as Surekha
 Jaya Prakash as Unknown
 Abhishek Yannam as Rishi

Cameo Appearances 
 Rajeev Kanakala as Karan
 Mamilla Shailaja Priya as Shambhavi: Vagdevi's sister
 Baby Aahana Burfi as Vagdevi: Shambhavi, Karan's daughter
 Shivashankar as
 Yeshashwi as Singer
 Chaitanya as Singer
 Gayathri as Singer

Title song

Adaptations

Dubbed versions

Production

Filming 
Due to the COVID-19 outbreak in India, No.1 Kodalu and all other television series and film shootings were suspended from March 19, 2020. Three months later, shooting was permitted and commenced from June, 2020. The series commenced telecasting new episodes from June 22, 2020.

References

External links 

 No.1 Kodalu on ZEE5

Zee Telugu original programming
Telugu-language television shows
2019 Indian television series debuts
Indian drama television series
Serial drama television series
Indian television soap operas